Ramhit Gupta (1932- 2013)  was an Indian politician and a leader of the Bharatiya Janata Party. He was the finance minister for the state government of Madhya Pradesh. He represented Amarpatan (Vidhan Sabha constituency) in the Madhya Pradesh Legislative Assembly. He died in 2013.

References

2013 deaths
1935 births
State cabinet ministers of Madhya Pradesh
Bharatiya Jana Sangh politicians
Madhya Pradesh MLAs 1967–1972
People from Satna district
Bharatiya Janata Party politicians from Madhya Pradesh